Michael Franks (born 20 April 1977) is a Canadian retired soccer player who has played professionally in North America, the Netherlands, and Scotland.

Career

Club career
Franks has played professionally for the Vancouver 86ers, PSV Eindhoven, RBC Roosendaal and Hibernian.

International career
Franks never earned a full cap for the Canada men's national soccer team, although he was a squad member for a number of competitions including the 2001 FIFA Confederations Cup and 2005 CONCACAF Gold Cup. He also earned youth caps.

Personal 
He is the younger brother of Chris Franks.

References

External links
 

1977 births
Living people
Soccer players from Edmonton
Canadian soccer players
Association football goalkeepers
UBC Thunderbirds soccer players
Vancouver Whitecaps (1986–2010) players
PSV Eindhoven players
RBC Roosendaal players
Hibernian F.C. players
Scottish Premier League players
USL First Division players
Canada men's youth international soccer players
Canada men's under-23 international soccer players
2001 FIFA Confederations Cup players
2005 CONCACAF Gold Cup players
Canadian expatriate soccer players
Canadian expatriate sportspeople in the Netherlands
Canadian expatriate sportspeople in Scotland
Expatriate footballers in the Netherlands
Expatriate footballers in Scotland